The Solicitor-General for Ireland was the holder of an Irish and then (from the Act of Union 1800) United Kingdom government office. The holder was a deputy to the Attorney-General for Ireland, and advised the Crown on Irish legal matters. On rare occasions, there was also a Deputy Attorney-General, who was distinct from the Solicitor-General. At least two holders of the office, Patrick Barnewall (1534–1550) and  Sir Roger Wilbraham (1586-1603), played a leading role in Government, although in Barnewall's case this may be partly because he was also King's Serjeant. As with the Solicitor General for England and Wales, the Solicitor-General for Ireland was usually a barrister rather than a solicitor.

The first record of a Solicitor General is in 1511, although the office may well be older than that since the records are incomplete. Early Solicitors almost always held the rank of Serjeant-at-law. In the sixteenth century a Principal Solicitor for Ireland shared the duties of the office: confusingly both were usually referred to as "the Solicitor". The  Principal Solicitor might also be a Serjeant-at-law, as Richard Finglas was.

Elizabeth I thought poorly of her Irish-born Law Officers, and from 1584 onwards there was a practice, which lasted for several decades, of appointing English-born lawyers as Solicitor General. At least one of them, Sir Roger Wilbraham (in office 1586-1603), was a key figure in the Dublin government for many years.

Unlike the Attorney General, he was not as a rule a  member of the Privy Council of Ireland, although he might be summoned by the Council to advise it.

With the establishment of the Irish Free State in 1922, the duties of both the  Attorney General and Solicitor General for Ireland were taken over by the Attorney General of Ireland, and the office of Solicitor General was abolished, apparently as an economy measure. This led to complaints over many years about the undue burden of work which was placed on the Attorney General, whose office was seriously understaffed until the 1930s.

Solicitors-General for Ireland (1511–1922)

16th century
Thomas Rochfort: appointed 1511
Thomas Luttrell: 9 September 1532 – 1534
Patrick Barnewall: 17 October 1534 – 1550
John Bathe: 16 October 1550 – 1554
James Dowdall: 20 July 1554 – 1565
Nicholas Nugent: 17 April 1565 – 1574
Richard Bellings: February 1574 – 1584
Jesse Smythes: 7 July 1584 – 1586
Roger Wilbraham: 11 February 1586 – 1603

17th century
Sir John Davies: 18 September 1603 – 1606
Sir Robert Jacobe: 19 April 1606 – 1618
Sir Richard Bolton: 31 December 1618 – 1622
Sir Edward Bolton: 5 December 1622 – 1640
Sir William Sambach: 8 June 1640 – ?
William Ellice: 1657 – 1658 (Commonwealth)
Robert Shapcote: 1658 – 1660 (Commonwealth)
Sir John Temple: 10 July 1660 – 1689
Sir Theobald Butler: 1689 – 25 July 1689
Sir Richard Levinge, Bt 3 November 1689 – 1695
Alan Brodrick: 10 May 1695 – 1704

18th century
Sir Richard Levinge, Bt: 4 April 1704 – 1709
John Forster: 8 September 1709 – 24 December 1709
William Whitshed: 24 December 1709 – 1711
Francis Bernard: 4 June 1711 – 1714
John Rogerson: 8 November 1714 – 14 May 1720
Thomas Marlay: 13 October 1720 – 1727
Robert Jocelyn: 5 April 1727 – 29 September 1730
John Bowes: 29 September 1730 – 3 September 1739
St George Caulfeild: 24 September 1739 – 23 December 1741
Warden Flood: 24 December 1741 – 27 August 1751
Philip Tisdall: 27 August 1751 – 31 July 1760
John Gore: 31 July 1760 – 24 August 1764
Marcus Paterson: 29 August 1764 – 18 June 1770
Godfrey Lill: 18 June 1770 – 1774
John Scott: 13 July 1774 – 17 October 1777
Robert Hellen: 31 October 1777 – 1779
Hugh Carleton: 7 April 1779 – 30 April 1787
Arthur Wolfe: 1 May 1787 – 16 July 1789
John Toler: 16 July 1789 – 26 June 1798
John Stewart: 26 June 1798 – 9 December 1799

19th century
William Cusack-Smith: 6 December 1800 – 1801
James McClelland: 17 December 1801 – 1803
William Conynham Plunket: 22 October 1803 – 15 October 1805
Charles Kendal Bushe: 15 October 1805 – 14 February 1822
Henry Joy: 20 February 1822 – 18 June 1827
John Doherty: 18 June 1827 – 23 December 1830
Philip Cecil Crampton: 23 December 1830 – 21 October 1834
Michael O'Loghlen: 21 October 1834 – 1834
Edward Pennefather: 27 January 1835 – 1835
Michael O'Loghlen: 29 April 1835 – 1835
John Richards: 21 September 1835 – 10 November 1836
Stephen Woulfe: 10 November 1836 – 3 February 1837
Maziere Brady: 3 February 1837 – February 1839
David Richard Pigot: 11 February 1839 – 14 August 1840
Richard Moore: 14 August 1840 – 1841
Edward Pennefather 21 September 1841 – 1841
Joseph Devonsher Jackson: 10 November 1841 – 9 September 1842
Thomas Cusack-Smith: 21 September 1842 – 1 November 1842
Richard Wilson Greene: 1 November 1842 – 2 February 1846
Abraham Brewster: 2 February 1846 – June 1846
James Henry Monahan: 16 July 1846 – 24 December 1847
John Hatchell: 24 December 1847 – 23 September 1850
Henry George Hughes: 26 September 1850 – February 1852
James Whiteside: February 1852 – December 1852
William Keogh: April 1853 – March 1855
John FitzGerald: March 1855 – March 1856
Jonathan Christian: March 1856 – February 1858
Henry George Hughes: February 1858 – 1858
Edmund Hayes: 1858 – June 1859
John George: June 1859 – 1859
Rickard Deasy: 1859 – February 1860
Thomas O'Hagan: February 1860 – 1861
James Anthony Lawson: 1861 – 1865
Edward Sullivan: 1865 – June 1866
Michael Morris: 3 August 1866 – 1 November 1866
Hedges Eyre Chatterton: 8 November 1866 – 1867
Robert Warren: 1867 – 1867
Michael Harrison: 1867 – 1868
John Thomas Ball: 1868 – 1868
Henry Ormsby: 1868 – 1868
Charles Robert Barry: 12 December 1868 – 26 January 1870
Richard Dowse: 14 February 1870 – 13 January 1872
Christopher Palles: 6 February 1872 – 5 November 1872
Hugh Law: 18 November 1872 – February 1874
Henry Ormsby: 12 March 1874 – 21 January 1875
Hon. David Plunket: 29 January 1875 – 1877
Gerald FitzGibbon: 3 March 1877 – 1878
Hugh Holmes: 14 December 1878 – April 1880
William Moore Johnson: 24 May 1880 – 17 November 1881
Andrew Porter: 18 November 1881 – 3 January 1883
John Naish: 9 January 1883 – 19 December 1883
Samuel Walker: 19 December 1883 – 1885
The MacDermot: 1885 – June 1885
John Monroe: 3 July 1885 – November 1885
John George Gibson: 1885 – January 1886
The MacDermot: February 1886 – July 1886
John George Gibson: August 1886 – 1887
Peter O'Brien: 1887 – 1888
Dodgson Hamilton Madden: 1888 – 1890
John Atkinson: 1890 – 1892
Edward Carson: June 1892 – August 1892
Charles Hare Hemphill: August 1892 – 1895
William Kenny: 28 August 1895 – 1898
Sir Dunbar Plunket Barton: 1898 – 1900

20th century
George Wright: 30 January 1900 – 1901
James Campbell: October 1901 – 1905
Redmond Barry: 20 December 1905 – 2 December 1909
Charles O'Connor: 2 December 1909 – 26 September 1911
Ignatius O'Brien: 19 October 1911 – 24 June 1912
Thomas Molony: 24 June 1912 – 10 April 1913
John Moriarty: 25 April 1913 – 20 June 1913
Jonathan Pim: 20 June 1913 – 1 July 1914
James O'Connor: 1 July 1914 – 8 January 1917
James Chambers: 19 March 1917 –  June 1917
Arthur Warren Samuels: 12 September 1917 – 7 April 1918
John Blake Powell: 7 April 1918 – 1918
Denis Henry: 27 November 1918 – 6 July 1919
Daniel Martin Wilson: 6 July 1919 – June 1921
Thomas Watters Brown: 12 June 1921 – 5 August 1921
Office abolished thereafter

Principal Solicitors for Ireland (1537–1574)
Walter Cowley: 7 September 1537 – 1546
John Bathe: 7 February 1546 – 1550
Richard Finglas: 17 October 1550 – 1574
James Dowdall: 20 July 1554 – 1565
Lucas Dillon 1565 – 1566
John Bathe: 20 October 1570 – 1574

References

Further reading
Hart, A.R.  History of the King's Serjeants at  law in  Ireland Four Courts Press Dublin  2000
 

Lists of government ministers of the United Kingdom
 
Political office-holders in pre-partition Ireland
Defunct ministerial offices in the United Kingdom